The Hunters ROTC was a Filipino guerrilla unit active during the Japanese occupation of the Philippines, and was the main anti-Japanese guerrilla group active in the area near the Philippine capital of Manila.  It was created upon the dissolution of the Philippine Military Academy. Cadet Terry Adevoso, refused to simply go home as cadets were ordered to do, and began recruiting fighters willing to undertake guerrilla action against the Japanese.  This force provided intelligence to the liberating forces led by General Douglas MacArthur, and took an active role in numerous battles, such as the Raid at Los Baños.

Origin
When war broke out in the Philippines, the staff and cadets of the Philippine Military Academy came down from Baguio to Manila.  On December 19, 1941 on the grounds of the University of Santo Tomas the cadets of Class 1942 and 1943 graduated earlier and received their commissions, and under their Superintendent Col. Fidel V. Segundo (USMA 1917) formed the 1st Regular Division.  

Some 300 cadets of Class 1944 and 1945 were in turn disbanded and told to go home as they were considered too young to fight in the war.  The cadets of these classes formed the nucleus of the Hunters ROTC by January 1942, with Miguel Ver in command, and Eleuterio Adevoso as his executive officer.

The Hunters ROTC banded together in a common desire to contribute to the war effort throughout the Bataan campaign. They worked to protect civilians and to assist the USAFFE forces by way of intelligence and propaganda. They were founded in Manila in January 1942 by Miguel Ver of the Philippine Military Academy, and moved to Rizal Province in April where they came under Col. Hugh Straughn's FAIT.  After the Japanese captured Straughn and Ver the executive officer, Eleuterio Adevoso took over.

Japanese occupation
Personal stories of sacrifice and heroism have been passed down through the generations of former Hunters ROTC members.  As recalled by former member Damaso Fernandez, the omnipresent reign of the Japanese occupation force in Manila was punctuated with the threat of murdering one's whole family if caught hiding intelligence.  One particular memory etched in Damaso's mind was when he was hiding a piece of intelligence to give to liberating forces in his pillowcase.  The Japanese raided and searched his home including his mattress without finding the papers.

After the surrender of American and Filipino forces on Bataan, the Hunters ROTC relocated to the Antipolo mountains.

The Hunters originally conducted operations with another guerrilla group called Marking Guerrillas, with whom they went about liquidating Japanese spies. Led by Miguel Ver, a PMA cadet, the Hunters raided the enemy-occupied Union College in Manila and seized 130 Enfield rifles.

The Hunters was one of the more effective south Luzon guerillas.

Philippine Liberation Campaign
They were among the most aggressive guerrillas in the war and made a daring guerrilla raid on June 24, 1944 at the New Bilibid Prison used by the Japanese in Muntinlupa, Rizal, with collaboration with the FACGF Fil-American Cavite Guerilla Forces of General Mariano N. Castaneda to free their captured members and to obtain more than 300 rifles in the armory. This was the only time an armed force was able to successfully enter New Bilibid.  

Most famous success of the Hunters ROTC was their participation in the liberation of Los Baños prison camp on February 23, 1945.  While units of the 11th Airborne Division came over to Los Baños, members of the Hunters ROTC pre-positioned themselves around the camp a few days before, relaying up-to-date intelligence reports on the camp.  Captain Bartolomeo Cabangbang, leader of the Central Luzon Penetration Party, said that the Hunters supplied the best intelligence data on Luzon.

During the Battle of Manila (1945), the Hunters ROTC, under the command of Lt. Col. Emmanuel V. de Ocampo, fought with the U.S. Army from Nasugbu, Batangas to the Manila General Post Office.  The Hunters also jointly operated with the Philippine Commonwealth Army and Philippine Constabulary and the American soldiers and military officers of the United States Army in many operations in Manila, Rizal, Cavite, Laguna, Batangas and Tayabas (now Quezon).

Legacy
The Headquarters Philippine Army (HPA) parade ground at Fort Bonifacio is named Hunters ROTC Field.  In February 1945, this area of Sakura Heiei (Cherry Blossom Barracks), as this military installation had been renamed by the Japanese, was overrun by the Forty-seventh ROTC Division as it led the advance of American Eleventh Airborne Division into this military installation.  Additionally, in Quezon City, there is a street named Hunters ROTC, and in Cainta a street formerly named St Francis Avenue now bears the name Hunters ROTC Avenue.  There is a memorial along the latter road dedicated to the guerrilla organization.

In film
"Representatives of Brazil, Argentina and Poland arrive for inauguration ceremony of Republic of the Philippines."  1946.  (criticalpast.com)
 Death was a Stranger. 1963.
 Unsurrendered 2:  The Hunters ROTC Guerrillas. Written and directed by Bani Logroño.  2015.

See also
Reserve Officers' Training Corps in the Philippines
List of American guerrillas in the Philippines

External links
Baatan Diary - research materials and information pertaining to World War II in the Philippines

References

 
Paramilitary organizations based in the Philippines
World War II resistance movements
Reserve Officers' Training Corps (Philippines)
Commonwealth of the Philippines